Delaware's 21st Senate district is one of 21 districts in the Delaware Senate. It has been represented by Republican Bryant Richardson since his 2014 defeat of Democrat Robert Venables Sr. It is the most Republican-leaning district in the Senate.

Geography
District 21 is based in the southwestern corner of Sussex County, including the communities of Seaford, Laurel, Delmar, Bethel, Gumboro, and Reliance.

Like all districts in the state, the 21st Senate district is located entirely within Delaware's at-large congressional district. It overlaps with the 35th, 39th, 40th, and 41st districts of the Delaware House of Representatives. It borders the state of Maryland.

Recent election results
Delaware Senators are elected to staggered four-year terms. Under normal circumstances, the 21st district holds elections in midterm years, except immediately after redistricting, when all seats are up for election regardless of usual cycle.

2018

2014

2012

Federal and statewide results in District 21

References 

21
Sussex County, Delaware